John T. "Whack" Hyder (July 10, 1912 – February 9, 2003) was an American college basketball coach. He is the second winningest coach in Georgia Institute of Technology's history with 292 wins. Hyder led the Yellow Jackets to their first NCAA Tournament appearance in 1960 where they advanced to the Elite Eight. In 1971, Georgia Tech reached the National Invitation Tournament championship game.

As a player, Hyder lettered in baseball, basketball, track, and cross country at Georgia Tech. After graduating in 1937 he spent three years playing in the New York Yankees' minor league baseball system. Hyder served in the United States Navy in World War II before returning to Georgia Tech as an assistant men's basketball coach in 1946. In 1951, he was promoted to head coach where he remained until 1973.

Further reading
Father Knows Best – Whack Hyder's paternal feeling for his players make Georgia Tech a basketball power. Tax, Jeremiah. Sports Illustrated. February 15, 1960. Retrieved on February 20, 2014.

References

1912 births
2003 deaths
Akron Yankees players
Augusta Tigers players
Baseball players from Georgia (U.S. state)
Basketball coaches from Georgia (U.S. state)
Basketball players from Georgia (U.S. state)
Butler Yankees players
Georgia Tech Yellow Jackets baseball players
Georgia Tech Yellow Jackets football players
Georgia Tech Yellow Jackets men's basketball coaches
Georgia Tech Yellow Jackets men's basketball players
Players of American football from Georgia (U.S. state)
Snow Hill Billies players
United States Navy personnel of World War II
American men's basketball players
People from Hall County, Georgia
People from Banks County, Georgia